Agawin Mo Man ang Lahat (International title: Stolen Love / ) is a 2006 Philippine television drama romance series broadcast by GMA Network. It stars Oyo Boy Sotto and Marian Rivera. It premiered on February 20, 2006 on the network's  Dramarama sa Hapon line up replacing Kung Mamahalin Mo Lang Ako. The series concluded on August 11, 2006 with a total of 123 episodes. It was replaced by Pinakamamahal in its timeslot.

Cast and characters

Lead cast
 Marian Rivera as Almira Dueñas-Valverde / Isadora Valencia / Alegra
 Oyo Boy Sotto as Nicolas "Nick" Valverde
 Bobby Andrews as Gonzalo Valverde
 Mylene Dizon as Greta Valverde
 Rita Avila as Clara Dueñas
 LJ Moreno as Leda

Supporting cast
 Perla Bautista as Meding Dueñas
 Jake Roxas
 Bernadette Allyson as Elizabeth "Beth" Lizadores
 Cheska Garcia as Sissy Lizadores-Valverde
 Matthew Mendoza as Chuck Lizadores
 Alma Lerma
 Gandong Cervantes
 Kookoo Gonzales
 Bea Candaza
 Martin Escudero as Emmanuel "Emman" Dueñas
 Kevin Santos
 Luz Imperial
 Frances Ignacio as Ingrid
 Bugs Daigo
 CJ Ramos
 Neil Ryan Sese as Teodoro "Teddy" Besa
 Carlene Aguilar as Giselle
 Peter Serrano
 Kakai Bautista as Rita
 Joel Molina
 Kevin Harris as Nol
 Malou Crisologo

Guest cast
 Nonie Buencamino as Ceding Dueñas
 Wendell Ramos as Tristan
 Johnny Revilla as Don Feliciano
 Arci Muñoz as Chantal

Accolades

References

External links
 

2006 Philippine television series debuts
2006 Philippine television series endings
Filipino-language television shows
GMA Network drama series
Philippine romance television series
Television series by TAPE Inc.
Television shows set in the Philippines